Studio Music Hall is a South Korean show. It airs on Mnet on Thursday at 18:00 (KST).

Format 
Season 1
A new music talk show with high-quality music talk and life is finally unveiled.

Season 2
The show focused on introducing a wide variety of music and artists, as well as having deep talks about the current lives of artists inside the studio, and providing 'high quality' live clips of the questing singers.

Host 
Season 1-2:

 Bae Soon-tak
 Kim Eana
 Kim Hee-chul

List of episodes

Season 1

Season 2

References 

2019 South Korean television series debuts
Korean-language television shows